Christopher Robin Felix (born May 27, 1964) is a Canadian former professional ice hockey defenceman. He played for several seasons with the Washington Capitals, who signed him as a free agent in 1988. Over four NHL seasons he played 35 games with 1 goal and 12 assists.

Felix represented Canada at the 1988 Winter Olympics where, in six games, he scored one goal and two assists.

He later played 11 more seasons, in Austria, Switzerland, Germany and the minor leagues.

Career statistics

Regular season and playoffs

International

External links

1964 births
Living people
Adler Mannheim players
Bakersfield Condors (1998–2015) players
Baltimore Skipjacks players
Canadian ice hockey defencemen
Fort Wayne Komets players
Genève-Servette HC players
Innsbrucker EV players
Ilves players
EC KAC players
Kaufbeurer Adler players
New Mexico Scorpions (WPHL) players
Sault Ste. Marie Greyhounds players
South Carolina Stingrays players
Topeka Scarecrows players
Undrafted National Hockey League players
Washington Capitals players
Ice hockey people from Ontario
Sportspeople from Brampton
Ice hockey players at the 1988 Winter Olympics
Olympic ice hockey players of Canada
Canadian expatriate ice hockey players in Austria
Canadian expatriate ice hockey players in Finland
Canadian expatriate ice hockey players in Germany
Canadian expatriate ice hockey players in the United States